I Miss You is the first special (third overall) mini album by the South Korean girl group Girl's Day. It was released on October 15, 2014 with the song of the same name used as title track for the album.

Background
Dream Tea Entertainment announced on October 2, 2014, that the group would be releasing a ballad song in the middle of October. The song was produced by Duble Sidekick, who had worked with the group for "Something" and "Darling".

On October 8, 2014, the group's agency revealed that the album would be released in the form of a smart card, touted as a world first. The card would include the title track along with four previously-released songs and would require a near field communication (NFC) capable smartphone to access the content through Kihno.

The music video for the lead track was released on October 15, 2014.

Promotions and release
Girl's Day announced that they would not be promoting "I Miss You" on the weekly music shows.

Track listing

Chart performance

Singles chart

Release history

Credits and personnel
Sojin - vocals
Yura - vocals, rap
Minah - vocals
Hyeri - vocals
Duble Sidekick - producing, songwriting, arranger, music

References

External links

2014 EPs
Korean-language EPs
Kakao M EPs
Girl's Day albums